Iroquois China Company was founded in 1905 in Solvay, New York, located on the western border of Syracuse near the southern shores of Onondaga Lake. It operated in Syracuse until closing. Although some references indicate that the company closed in 1969, certain designs (e.g., "Informal", "Museum White") were advertised and sold until the early-mid 1970s.

Seibel also designed a line called Impromptu the first designs were Bridal White, Frolic, Vision, Jardinieres, Pins and Beads, Were Current in 1956, New Geometric Patterns like, Parasols and Pyramids. Other abstract patterns included Aztec, Fjord, Tiara, Pompon, Tiara, Pompon Garland and El Camino.

Back stamps

Advertisements

References

External links 

 Psychedelic Peter Max Iroquois China Ashtray 6 Inch
 Village of Solvay, NY founded 1794
 Modish 20th Century - Iroquois China Company
 Iroquois China Company - Chardon Rose 1950s

Defunct companies based in Syracuse, New York
Defunct companies based in New York (state)
Manufacturing companies established in 1905
Manufacturing companies disestablished in 1969
Ceramics manufacturers of the United States
Porcelain of the United States
Kitchenware brands
1905 establishments in New York (state)
1969 disestablishments in New York (state)
American companies disestablished in 1969